Midigo is located in Yumbe District of West Nile Region Northern Uganda. It is one of the Sub-Counties of Aringa North County in Yumbe District

Geographical location 
It is located near the Uganda Boarder with South Sudan.

Social Services

Health 
1.Midigo Health Center IV

Education 
Midigo has a number of schools located in the Sub-County both private and Government Aided

 Midigo Calvary Nursery and Primary school

References 

West Nile sub-region
Yumbe District
Populated places in Northern Region, Uganda